Rachel Pulido (born January 26, 1967) is a television writer. She graduated from Harvard University, where she was a writer for the college humor magazine the Harvard Lampoon.  She has written for The Simpsons and Mission Hill. She is married to The Simpsons' season 7 and 8 showrunner, and Mission Hill co-creator, Bill Oakley. They have two daughters, Mary and Elizabeth, and a son named James, who has participated in two The Simpsons DVD commentaries.

She was the first Hispanic staff writer in the history of The Simpsons. She has said that she thinks of herself as Mexican.

The Simpsons episodes that she has been credited with writing:
"22 Short Films About Springfield" (contributor)
"Grade School Confidential"

References

1967 births
The Harvard Lampoon alumni
Living people